Paarai is a 2003 Indian Tamil-language action drama film directed by K. S. Ravikumar. The film stars Sarath Kumar, Jayaram, Meena, and Ramya Krishnan. The music was composed by Sabesh–Murali. The film is the Tamil remake of the Malayalam film Mahayanam and was released on 13 June 2003.

Plot 

Durairaj (Sarath Kumar) is a lorry driver who is tough as nails. He had a bitter childhood, has no relatives or friends, and his only solace is Jayaram (Jayaram), his cleaner who is just the opposite of him. Jayaram is a happy-go-lucky guy who dotes on his wife Mallika (Meena), mother (Vadivukkarasi), and daughter, and dreams of making enough money to build a small house for his family. Durai and Jayaram share a special bond as they understand each other well.

On his way to see his family, Jayaram dies in an accident, and Durai goes to his village with the body. There he finds that Jayaram's family needs his help, and out of sympathy, he decides to settle there and build a small house according to his friend's last wish. There, he comes across a local landlord Vijayan (Vijayan), who cheats the illiterate villagers by giving them loans and later taking over their property. Then there is a tea shop owner Vasantha (Ramya Krishnan), on whom the entire men folk lust. But she is hardworking, and at the same time foul-mouthed and a terror. Vasantha's brother, who is in love with Vijayan's daughter, starts the fight between Vijayan and Durai. Durai works hard to make a house for Mallika, and when the villagers suspect his good intentions, he proves to them that he has a sisterly affection towards her, as he has a soft corner for Vasantha. As the fight goes on for Durai and Vijayan, Vijayan destroys the house that Durai built for his friends. Of this anger, he tries to get revenge. How Durai wins over the villagers and fights against injustice against Vijayan and his son forms the rest of the story.

Cast 
 Sarath Kumar as Durairaj (Durai)
 Meena as Mallika
 Jayaram as Jayaram
 Ramya Krishnan as Vasantha
 Vijayan as Vijayan
 Mansoor Ali Khan as Vijayan's son
 Vinu Chakravarthy as Chakravarthi
 Ramesh Khanna as Barber
 Chitti Babu as Sudalai
 Vadivukkarasi as Jayaram's mother
 Ajay Rathnam as Sub-Inspector
 Sabitha Anand as Rukmani, Durai's mother
 Crane Manohar as Seller
 Dinesh Sha as childhood Durairaj
 K. S. Ravikumar in a special appearance as supervisor
 Ashok Raja special appearance in the "Aeroplane Parakkudhu"

Soundtrack 
Soundtrack was composed by Sabesh Murali, with lyrics by Vairamuthu.

 "Aeroplane Parakkudhu" – Udit Narayan
 "Naan Oru Kanaa Kanden" – Harish Raghavendra, Sujatha Mohan
 "Kannukkul Tick Tick" – Karthik Raja, Pop Shalini
 "Nanbane Nanbane" – Mano
 "Vinayaga Vinayaga" – Anuradha Sriram
 "En Thaai" – Krishnaraj

Reception 
Chennai Online called it "absorbing and sensitively crafted".

References

External links 

2000s Tamil-language films
2003 films
Films directed by K. S. Ravikumar
Tamil remakes of Malayalam films
Trucker films